Quercus estremadurensis is a species of oak in the family Fagaceae, native to Portugal, western Spain and Morocco. It was first described by Otto Karl Anton Schwarz in 1935. It has also been treated as a subspecies of Quercus robur, Q. robur subsp. estremadurensis. It is placed in section Quercus.

References

estremadurensis
Flora of Morocco
Flora of Portugal
Flora of Spain
Plants described in 1935